The 2011–12 Idaho Vandals men's basketball team represented the University of Idaho during the 2011–12 NCAA Division I men's basketball season. The team played the first part of their season at Memorial Gym while waiting for the football season to end, then played where the football team plays in the Cowan Spectrum in Moscow, Idaho. They are members of the Western Athletic Conference and were led by fourth-year head coach Don Verlin. They finished the season 19–14, 9–5 in WAC play to finish in third place. They lost in the quarterfinals of the WAC Basketball tournament to Hawaii. They were invited to the 2012 CollegeInsider.com Tournament where they defeated UC Santa Barbara in the first round before falling in the second round to fellow WAC member Utah State.

Roster

Schedule

|-
!colspan=9| Exhibition

|-
!colspan=9| Regular Season

|-
!colspan=9| WAC tournament

|-
!colspan=9| 2012 CIT

References

Idaho Vandals
Idaho Vandals men's basketball seasons
Idaho
Idaho
Idaho